The 1997–98 Wisconsin Badgers men's basketball team represented the University of Wisconsin–Madison as a member of the Big Ten Conference during the 1997-98 NCAA Division I men's basketball season. Head coach Dick Bennett completed his third season coaching with the Badgers. In the program's centennial season, the team played its home games in Madison, Wisconsin at both the UW Field House and later the Kohl Center, which the Badgers opened on January 17, 1998, with a 56–33 win over Northwestern.

Season summary 
Wisconsin was unable to build on the previous year's success during a tumultuous season. Down two of its top players by midseason, the squad struggled to shoot well consistently. The Badgers scored fewer than 50 points seven times, going winless in those games. Notably, Wisconsin let back-to-back home games slip away to Iowa (79-76) and Illinois (53-47 in overtime) to start February, which dropped its season mark to 10–13. The losses were part of an 11-game Big Ten losing streak to end the regular season, which was interrupted only by a non-conference win over Wisconsin-Milwaukee.

True to Bennett's style, however, the Badgers led the Big Ten in scoring defense by allowing 62.6 points per contest. Though the team failed to receive a postseason invite, the substantial minutes played by four freshman laid groundwork for the memorable tournament run to come in 2000. Wisconsin rebounded from consecutive early losses to Pepperdine and Pacific to beat No. 18 Oklahoma and Montana to win the consolation bracket at the Big Island Invitational in Hawaii. Other highlights include going 2–1 against Top 25 teams in non-conference play and christening a new arena with a win.

A No. 10 seed in the inaugural Big Ten tournament, Wisconsin opened against Penn State in Chicago. Freshman Maurice Linton's jumper in the final seconds advanced the Badgers, 52–51. In the quarterfinals, Illinois held Wisconsin to 10 points at halftime. A furious Badger comeback erased an 18-point deficit but ultimately fell short in the final six minutes.

Ty Calderwood injury 
Lingering complications from off-season knee surgery prevented Ty Calderwood from playing a single minute in 1997–98. It was a substantial blow, as a year earlier, the junior point guard led the Big Ten in steals and guided Wisconsin back to the NCAA Tournament. Calderwood was forced to take a medical redshirt. As a result, Mike Kelley became the first Badger freshman guard to start the season opener since Rick Olson in 1982.

Sam Okey's departure 
Junior forward Sam Okey was suspended by head coach Dick Bennett for the start of the campaign, including the first two regular season games, reportedly for marijuana use. Upon his reinstatement, Okey battled back spasms which caused him to miss four of the next 13 games as Wisconsin fought to an 8–7 record. Clashes over his role, work ethic and off-the-court issues came to a head on January 13, 1998, when Okey quit the team. The Badgers went 4-12 the remainder of the season. Okey transferred to the University of Iowa to play his senior year.

Awards 
Sean Mason was a Honorable Mention All-Big Ten pick by the coaches and media at the conclusion of the season.

Roster

Schedule

|-
!colspan=8 style=""| Regular Season

|-
!colspan=8 style=""|Big Ten tournament

Player Statistics

Records 
Sean Mason made the first field goal in Kohl Center history on January 17, 1998, vs. Northwestern.

A February 11, 1998 loss to Northwestern, in which he went 0-for-4 from beyond the arc, was the last game Sean Mason would fail to make a three-pointer in his Badger career. His streak of 39 straight games with a three-pointer began February 14, 1998 against Penn State and was a school record until being eclipsed by Bronson Koenig in 2016.

References 

Wisconsin
Wisconsin Badgers men's basketball seasons
Wisconsin Badgers men's b
Wisconsin Badgers men's b